The 2002 RTHK Top 10 Gold Songs Awards was held in 2002 for the 2001 music season.

Top 10 song awards
The top 10 songs (十大中文金曲) of 2002 are as follows.

Other awards
The top 10 outstanding artist was also extended to 15 artists.

References
 RTHK top 10 gold song awards 2002

RTHK Top 10 Gold Songs Awards
Rthk Top 10 Gold Songs Awards, 2002
Rthk Top 10 Gold Songs Awards, 2002